The Morton Memorial Library is an historic structure along Kelly Street in the hamlet of Rhinecliff, New York, just east of the Hudson River.

History
Anna L. and Levi P. Morton of the nearby Ellerslie estate, erected the Morton Memorial Library in Rhinecliff in memory of their daughter Lena.  It was dedicated as a library in 1908.

Description
It is situated on a slight knoll facing west. The library is a one-story brick civic building designed in the Colonial Revival style. Throughout its interior, restrained oak woodwork is preserved in a variety of features including wainscoting, trim around windows and doors, and mantelpieces. It is considered an historically significant example of public architecture in Rhinecliff. In the early nineteenth century, it served as a center for education and culture within the area. It was added to the National Register of Historic Places on July 9, 1987.

See also

 Mid-Hudson Library System

References

Libraries on the National Register of Historic Places in New York (state)
National Register of Historic Places in Dutchess County, New York
Buildings and structures in Rhinebeck, New York
1908 establishments in New York (state)
Libraries established in 1908
Houses in Rhinebeck, New York